This is the list of the top 50 albums of 2002 in New Zealand

Summary

Chart

Key
 – Album of New Zealand origin

External links
 The Official NZ Music Chart, RIANZ website

2002 in New Zealand music
2002 record charts
Albums 2002